Wallacestone is a village in the area of Falkirk, central Scotland.

The population of Wallacestone was recorded as 746 residents at the time of the 2001 census.

History
Nearby Falkirk was the site of William Wallace's last battle during the war of independence against the invading English. On 22 July 1298 Wallace faced the English army, commanded by Edward I. The Scots were defeated and many thousands were killed. The exact site of the battle has yet to be discovered and still generates much debate. However, at Wallacestone is situated a stone pillar which replaced a much older stone to mark the place where Wallace stood to watch the approach of the English army from Linlithgow and command his army at the subsequent battle.

The viewpoint of Wallace looks across the Forth Valley, including the Forth Bridges to the east, the carse of Falkirk, Wallace Monument at Stirling and Stirling Castle to the north. It also includes as far away as the start of the Highlands at Ben Lomond and the Trossachs to the west.

See also
Falkirk Braes villages
List of places in Falkirk council area

References

External links

Villages in Falkirk (council area)
Grangemouth